Officina Stellare is an international engineering company, leader in the design and manufacture of complex opto-mechanical and aerospace instrumentation for ground based and space based applications.

Company
Officina Stellare SpA, is a small medium-sized company with headquarters in Sarcedo (VI), listed on the AIM of Borsa Italiana and leader in the design and manufacture of complex opto-mechanical and aerospace instrumentation for Ground and Space-based applications. The Company stands out in the Italian and international industrial panorama for the entirely in-house availability of the know-how and processes necessary for the development, implementation and commissioning of its products and systems. Combining top-level technical-scientific skills in very different areas with flexibility and time-to-market actions, is one of the most significant and specific strengths of Officina Stellare SpA. The company, in addition to being involved in space experimental and research projects, counts among its clients prestigious Research Institutes and Universities, Space Agencies, corporate and government players in the aerospace and defense market, both nationally and internationally.

Products
The range of optical systems includes: Ritchey Chrétien, Aplanatic Ritchey Chrétien, Ultra Corrected Ritchey Chrétien, Riccardi Dall-Kirkham, Riccardi-Honders, Maksutov Cassegrain, Apochromatic Refractors, custom design optics.

Observatories, scientific and educational institutes with Officina Stellare telescopes
 Cerro Tololo Inter-American Observatory - Coquimbo Region, Chile
 MIT Massachusetts Institute of Technology - Massachusetts, United States
 Caltech California Institute of Technology - California, United States
 National Taiwan University - Taipei, Taiwan
 Apache Point Observatory Galactic Evolution Experiment - Astronomical Observatory of Aosta Valley - St. Barthélemy, Italy
 SOFIA Stratospheric Observatory for Infrared Astronomy - NASA's Ames Research Center - California, United States

See also 

List of Italian companies

References

External links
Officina Stellare website

Telescope manufacturers
Italian brands
Engineering companies of Italy
Technology companies established in 2009
Italian companies established in 2009